Žarko P. Todorović "Valter" (1907 Belgrade - 2004 Paris) was one of the leaders of the Chetnik resistance in the first phase of World War II in the German occupied Yugoslavia, serving as first commander of the undercover Chetnik headquarters in Belgrade.

Early life 
Todorović was born in Belgrade in 1907. He attended a Military Academy for both primary and secondary education and later attended the esteemed École Militaire in Paris, France for officer training. There, Todorović attended classes taught by Charles de Gaulle.

Before the Second World War, Todorović was a major in the army of the Kingdom of Yugoslavia, working in the intelligence of the Supreme Command.

Invasion of Yugoslavia (April–July 1941) 

With the onset of the invasion of Yugoslavia in 1941 (also known as the April War), Todorović, now at the rank of lieutenant colonel, was sent to the area to assist resistance fighters, known collectively as the Chetniks.  He joined the Ravna Gora Movement, a resistance cell led by Dragoljub "Draža" Mihailović, serving as a communications officer.

In May 1941, Todorović delivered an invitation to Dragomir Jovanović to join the Chetniks. Jovanović turned down the offer, and was later convicted of collaborating with German official and executed.

Žarko relayed information between the Chetnik movement with British Intelligence and Yugoslav government-in-exile. He sent a report regarding the organized resistance on Ravna Gora against the German occupation. This report included the initials of the commander of the uprising (D.M.) and provided short and long wave frequencies for further communication. The message bore the signature of General Staff Major Z.P.T., whose handwriting was recognized to be of Žarko Todorović. At his 1946 trial, Mihajlović stated that Todorović also made contact with the American Legation.

Todorović also organized radio communication between Stanislav Rapotec and Mihajlović. Jovan Đonović, a delegate of the Yugoslavian government-in-exile, reported to Masterson, the chief of the Belgrade mission of British intelligence, that Todorović (code-name ZPT — from Žarko P Todorović) contacted the committee of thirty-two (the Central National Revolutionary Committee).

In July 1941, upon expanding the influence of the Ravna Gora Movement cell, Mihajlović gave Todorović command of the northern province, based in Belgrade. In this position, Todorović started with activities aimed to establish Chetnik undercover operations in German-occupied Belgrade.

First arrest 
Within a month of commanding the Belgrade Chetnik headquarters, Germans managed to break the code Todorović used to communicate with Mihajlović's headquarters, and were able to locate and arrest Todorović at the end of July 1941. German officer Paul Bader boasted in the report he sent to his superior commander that the arrest of Todorović was a heavy loss for Mihajlović's organization in Belgrade. However, Todorović soon escaped. Against the order of the Supreme Command, he transferred command of the Belgrade headquarters to Major Radoslav Đurić, and went to Croatia. Since the command was often target of Gestapo activities, its leadership frequently changed; after Đurić, command was given to Dušan Manojlović, then Saša Mihajlović, and then again back to Žarko Todorović, who had returned to Belgrade.

Second and third arrest 
In February 1943, the Belgrade Gestapo arrested Todorović after an illegal radio station was discovered. He was transported to Zagreb for further interrogation and again managed to escape from the prison due to the help of Ustaše intelligence officer Zvonko Katalinić and an officer in the Croatian Ministry of Internal Affairs. After Todorović was released he was used by Hans Helm, a German attache with the Croatian Ministry of Internal Affairs, to trace other members of his intelligence network. They used their agent Radoslav Spitler to infiltrate the Chetniks, acting as Todorović's courier. Spitler delivered to Helm copies of all Todorović's correspondence with the headquarters in Belgrade. As soon as Helm collected the data regarding Todorović's intelligence network, he arrested him again and sent him to the Mauthausen concentration camp on September 9, 1943. Todorović survived in Mauthausen for six months until the end of the war, managing to make a vegetable garden - the produce of which he shared with other inmates.

After Second World War 
After being liberated, Todorović joined the French Foreign Legion, retaining the rank of Lt. Colonel. During his ten years of service, he fought in Indochina, including the war in Vietnam. After his service, he acquired French citizenship and was admitted to the General Staff of the French Army until he retired in the ranks of Colonel General Staff.

Todorović died in Paris 2004.

Legacy 
In the 2000s a series of reports was published in newspapers in Serbia, emphasizing that Todorovic's biography was inspiration for a famous Serbian TV series, Otpisani.

References

Sources 

 
 
 
 

1907 births
2004 deaths
Chetniks
French Army officers
Mauthausen concentration camp survivors
Yugoslav emigrants to France